Vincetoxicum is a genus of plants in the family Apocynaceae. Although the species in Vincetoxicum have sometimes been included in Cynanchum, chemical and molecular evidence shows that Vincetoxicum is more closely related to Tylophora, now included in Vincetoxicum. The generic name means "poison-beater" in Botanical Latin because of the plants' supposed antidotal effects against snakebite.

Species

Species accepted by the Plants of the World Online as of January 2023:

Vincetoxicum adnatum 
Vincetoxicum ambiguum 
Vincetoxicum amplexicaule 
Vincetoxicum angustifolium 
Vincetoxicum anomalum 
Vincetoxicum anthopotamicum 
Vincetoxicum apiculatum 
Vincetoxicum arachnoideum 
Vincetoxicum arenicola 
Vincetoxicum aristolochioides 
Vincetoxicum arnottianum 
Vincetoxicum ascyrifolium 
Vincetoxicum assadii 
Vincetoxicum atratum 
Vincetoxicum augustinianum 
Vincetoxicum auriculatum 
Vincetoxicum auritum 
Vincetoxicum austrokiusianum 
Vincetoxicum badium 
Vincetoxicum balakrishnanii 
Vincetoxicum barbatum 
Vincetoxicum belostemma 
Vincetoxicum biglandulosum 
Vincetoxicum bilobatum 
Vincetoxicum biondioides 
Vincetoxicum brachystelmoides 
Vincetoxicum bracteatum 
Vincetoxicum brassii 
Vincetoxicum brevipes 
Vincetoxicum brownii 
Vincetoxicum caffrum 
Vincetoxicum cambodiense 
Vincetoxicum cameroonicum 
Vincetoxicum canescens 
Vincetoxicum capparidifolium 
Vincetoxicum cardiostephanum 
Vincetoxicum carnosum 
Vincetoxicum cernuum 
Vincetoxicum chekiangense 
Vincetoxicum chinense 
Vincetoxicum chingtungense 
Vincetoxicum christineae 
Vincetoxicum cinerascens 
Vincetoxicum cissoides 
Vincetoxicum clemensiae 
Vincetoxicum coddii 
Vincetoxicum coloratum 
Vincetoxicum confusum 
Vincetoxicum congolanum 
Vincetoxicum conspicuum 
Vincetoxicum cordatum 
Vincetoxicum cordifolium 
Vincetoxicum coriaceum 
Vincetoxicum costantinianum 
Vincetoxicum crassifolium 
Vincetoxicum crassipes 
Vincetoxicum creticum 
Vincetoxicum cycleoides 
Vincetoxicum dahomense 
Vincetoxicum dalatense 
Vincetoxicum dalzellii 
Vincetoxicum darvasicum 
Vincetoxicum deltoideum 
Vincetoxicum dionysiense 
Vincetoxicum diplostigma 
Vincetoxicum doianum 
Vincetoxicum dorgelonis 
Vincetoxicum elmeri 
Vincetoxicum emeiense 
Vincetoxicum erectum 
Vincetoxicum exile 
Vincetoxicum fasciculatum 
Vincetoxicum flanaganii 
Vincetoxicum flavum 
Vincetoxicum fleckii 
Vincetoxicum flexuosum 
Vincetoxicum floribundum 
Vincetoxicum fordii 
Vincetoxicum forrestii 
Vincetoxicum forsteri 
Vincetoxicum fruticulosum 
Vincetoxicum funebre 
Vincetoxicum fuscatum 
Vincetoxicum gilbertii 
Vincetoxicum gilletii 
Vincetoxicum glabriflorum 
Vincetoxicum glaucescens 
Vincetoxicum glaucirameum 
Vincetoxicum glaucum 
Vincetoxicum globiferum 
Vincetoxicum govanii 
Vincetoxicum gracilentum 
Vincetoxicum gracillimum 
Vincetoxicum grandiflorum 
Vincetoxicum hainanense 
Vincetoxicum harmandii 
Vincetoxicum helferi 
Vincetoxicum hellwigii 
Vincetoxicum hemsleyanum 
Vincetoxicum henryanum 
Vincetoxicum henryi 
Vincetoxicum heterophyllum 
Vincetoxicum himalaicum 
Vincetoxicum hirsutum 
Vincetoxicum hirundinaria 
Vincetoxicum hookerianum 
Vincetoxicum hoyoense 
Vincetoxicum hui 
Vincetoxicum huteri 
Vincetoxicum hybanthera 
Vincetoxicum hydrophilum 
Vincetoxicum inamoenum 
Vincetoxicum indicum 
Vincetoxicum inhambanense 
Vincetoxicum insigne 
Vincetoxicum insulicola 
Vincetoxicum iphisia 
Vincetoxicum iringensis 
Vincetoxicum irrawadense 
Vincetoxicum izuense 
Vincetoxicum jacquemontianum 
Vincetoxicum japonicum 
Vincetoxicum josephrockii 
Vincetoxicum juzepczukii 
Vincetoxicum katoi 
Vincetoxicum kerrii 
Vincetoxicum koi 
Vincetoxicum krameri 
Vincetoxicum lancilimbum 
Vincetoxicum laxiforme 
Vincetoxicum lenifolium 
Vincetoxicum leptanthum 
Vincetoxicum leschenaultii 
Vincetoxicum liebianum 
Vincetoxicum lii 
Vincetoxicum lineare 
Vincetoxicum linearisepalum 
Vincetoxicum linifolium 
Vincetoxicum longifolium 
Vincetoxicum longipes 
Vincetoxicum lugardiae 
Vincetoxicum lui 
Vincetoxicum luridum 
Vincetoxicum lycioides 
Vincetoxicum macrophyllum 
Vincetoxicum mairei 
Vincetoxicum matsumurae 
Vincetoxicum membranaceum 
Vincetoxicum microcentrum 
Vincetoxicum microstachys 
Vincetoxicum miquelianum 
Vincetoxicum mongolicum 
Vincetoxicum monticola 
Vincetoxicum mozaffarianii 
Vincetoxicum mukdenense 
Vincetoxicum nanum 
Vincetoxicum neglectum 
Vincetoxicum nicobaricum 
Vincetoxicum nigrum 
Vincetoxicum nipponicum 
Vincetoxicum oblongum 
Vincetoxicum oculatum 
Vincetoxicum oligophyllum 
Vincetoxicum oshimae 
Vincetoxicum paniculatum 
Vincetoxicum pannonicum 
Vincetoxicum parviflorum 
Vincetoxicum parviurnulum 
Vincetoxicum parvum 
Vincetoxicum petrense 
Vincetoxicum philippicum 
Vincetoxicum pictum 
Vincetoxicum pierrei 
Vincetoxicum pilosellum 
Vincetoxicum pingshanicum 
Vincetoxicum polyanthum 
Vincetoxicum potamophilum 
Vincetoxicum pumilum 
Vincetoxicum × purpurascens 
Vincetoxicum raddeanum 
Vincetoxicum rechingeri 
Vincetoxicum rehmannii 
Vincetoxicum renchangii 
Vincetoxicum revolutum 
Vincetoxicum riparium 
Vincetoxicum robinsonii 
Vincetoxicum rockii 
Vincetoxicum rossicum 
Vincetoxicum rotundifolium 
Vincetoxicum roylei 
Vincetoxicum rupestre 
Vincetoxicum rupicola 
Vincetoxicum × sakaianum 
Vincetoxicum sakesarense 
Vincetoxicum sarasinorum 
Vincetoxicum scandens 
Vincetoxicum schimperi 
Vincetoxicum schmalhausenii 
Vincetoxicum schneideri 
Vincetoxicum secamonoides 
Vincetoxicum setosum 
Vincetoxicum shaanxiense 
Vincetoxicum siamicum 
Vincetoxicum sibiricum 
Vincetoxicum sieboldii 
Vincetoxicum silvestre 
Vincetoxicum silvestrii 
Vincetoxicum simianum 
Vincetoxicum sinaicum 
Vincetoxicum somaliense 
Vincetoxicum sootepense 
Vincetoxicum speciosum 
Vincetoxicum spirale 
Vincetoxicum splendidum 
Vincetoxicum stauntonii 
Vincetoxicum stauropolitanum 
Vincetoxicum stenophyllum 
Vincetoxicum stewartianum 
Vincetoxicum stocksii 
Vincetoxicum strigosum 
Vincetoxicum stylesii 
Vincetoxicum subcanescens 
Vincetoxicum sublanceolatum 
Vincetoxicum subramanii 
Vincetoxicum sui 
Vincetoxicum svetlanae 
Vincetoxicum sylvaticum 
Vincetoxicum taihangense 
Vincetoxicum taiwanense 
Vincetoxicum tanakae 
Vincetoxicum tenerrimum 
Vincetoxicum tengii 
Vincetoxicum tenuipedunculatum 
Vincetoxicum thailandense 
Vincetoxicum thorelii 
Vincetoxicum tmoleum 
Vincetoxicum tridactylatum 
Vincetoxicum tsaii 
Vincetoxicum tsiangii 
Vincetoxicum tsiukowense 
Vincetoxicum tylophoroides 
Vincetoxicum ucrainicum 
Vincetoxicum umbelliferum 
Vincetoxicum uncinatum 
Vincetoxicum utriculosum 
Vincetoxicum versicolor 
Vincetoxicum verticillatum 
Vincetoxicum villosum 
Vincetoxicum volubile 
Vincetoxicum wangii 
Vincetoxicum williamsii 
Vincetoxicum woollsii 
Vincetoxicum xinpingense 
Vincetoxicum yamanakae 
Vincetoxicum yingii 
Vincetoxicum yonakuniense 
Vincetoxicum yunnanense 
Vincetoxicum zeylanicum 

formerly included
moved to other genera (Alexitoxicon, Ampelamus, Antitoxicum, Asclepias, Blyttia, Cynanchum, Dictyanthus, Diplolepis, Gonolobus, Heterostemma, Ischnostemma, Macroscepis, Matelea, Orthosia, Pentatropis, Petalostelma, Polystemma, Seutera, Telminostelma)

Gallery

References

External links
 

 
Apocynaceae genera
Taxonomy articles created by Polbot